The Flylight Dragonfly is a British ultralight trike, designed by Ben Ashman and produced by Flylight Airsports of Northamptonshire. The aircraft is supplied as a complete ready-to-fly-aircraft.

Development of the Dragonfly started in 2007 with the aircraft entering series production in 2008.

Design and development
The Dragonfly was designed to comply with the Fédération Aéronautique Internationale microlight category, the UK Single-Seat De-Regulation (SSDR) guidelines, as well as the US FAR 103 Ultralight Vehicles rules. It features a strut-braced Aeros Discus hang glider-style high-wing, weight-shift controls, a single-seat open cockpit, retractable tricycle landing gear and a single engine in pusher configuration.

The aircraft is made from bolted-together aluminum tubing, with its double surface wing covered in Dacron sailcloth. Its  span wing is supported by a single tube-type kingpost and uses an "A" frame weight-shift control bar. The powerplant is a single cylinder, air-cooled four-stroke,  Bailey V4 200 engine, with the single cylinder, air-cooled, two-stroke  Simonini Mini-3 or  Simonini Mini-2 engines optional.

With its manual, or optionally electrically retractable landing gear the aircraft can be folded up and ground transported in the trunk of a car.

A number of different wings can be fitted to the basic carriage, including Aeros Discus 15T, 14 and 12 as well as the Aeros Combat 12T.

Variants
Flylight E-Dragon
Electric aircraft version.
Flylight Motorfloater
Simplified model with single surface wing and fixed landing gear.
Flylight Libelle
High performance variant equipped with a single cylinder, air-cooled, two-stroke  Simonini Mini-3 engine and the "topless" strut-braced Aeros Combat 12T wing.

Specifications (Dragonfly)

References

External links

2000s British sport aircraft
2000s British ultralight aircraft
Single-engined pusher aircraft
Ultralight trikes